This list is of the Cultural Properties of Japan designated in the category of  for the Prefecture of Nara.

National Cultural Properties
As of 1 November 2015, ten Important Cultural Properties have been designated, being of national significance.

Prefectural Cultural Properties
As of 1 May 2015, seven properties have been designated at a prefectural level.

Municipal Cultural Properties
Properties designated at a municipal level include:

Registered Cultural Properties
As of 1 November 2015, one property has been registered (as opposed to designated).

See also
 Cultural Properties of Japan
 List of Historic Sites of Japan (Nara)
 Yamato Province
 Nara National Museum
 List of National Treasures of Japan (historical materials)
 List of Cultural Properties of Japan - paintings (Nara)

References

External links
  Cultural Properties in Nara Prefecture

Cultural Properties,historical materials
Historical materials,Nara